Gothatuwa is a suburb of Colombo in the Western Province of Sri Lanka. It is connected to Sri Lankan transport network by Gothatuwa-Pettah Road and Kohilawatta-Kollupitiya Road.

References

See also
List of towns in Western Province, Sri Lanka

Populated places in Western Province, Sri Lanka